Derek R. Peterson (born May 13, 1971) is an American historian specializing in the cultural history of East Africa. He is currently a professor of history and African studies at the University of Michigan.

He was the recipient of a MacArthur "Genius Grant" in 2017.

Education and career 
Born May 13, 1971, Peterson is from Maine, New York and attended Maine–Endwell High School. He studied history and political science at the University of Rochester, graduating in 1993. His interest in African studies was sparked by a trip to Kenya in his sophomore year, and at Rochester he studied under African scholars Elias Mandala and Sam Nolutshungu. After graduating, he was awarded a Fulbright grant to study in Kenya for a year. He then went on to the University of Minnesota, studying with Allen Isaacman, and obtained his PhD in 2000.

Peterson taught at the College of New Jersey between 2000 and 2004. Between 2004 and 2009 he was the director of Centre for African Studies at the University of Cambridge, where he edited a series of monographs on African studies, and initiated an academic exchange programme between Cambridge and universities in Africa. He took a position at the University of Michigan in 2009, joining its newly founded African Studies Center (ASC).

Peterson has been a visiting fellow at the University of Notre Dame's Kellogg Institute, was elected a Corresponding Fellow of the British Academy in 2016, and was awarded a Guggenheim Fellowship in 2016. He won the African Studies Association's 2013 Hersokovits Prize for his book Ethnic Patriotism and the East African Revival.

Selected publications

Monographs

Edited volumes

References

External links 
 Personal website
 Lists of research output from the University of Michigan
 Interview with the American Historical Review

1971 births
Living people
21st-century American historians
21st-century American male writers
People from Broome County, New York
University of Rochester alumni
University of Minnesota alumni
The College of New Jersey faculty
Academics of the University of Cambridge
Fellows of Selwyn College, Cambridge
University of Michigan faculty
Corresponding Fellows of the British Academy
MacArthur Fellows
Historians of Africa
Cultural historians
Historians from New York (state)
American male non-fiction writers